Virginia Lee Gregg (March 6, 1916 – September 15, 1986) was an American actress known for her many roles in radio dramas and television series.

Early life
Born in Harrisburg, Illinois, she was the daughter of musician Dewey Alphaleta (née Todd) and businessman Edward William Gregg. She had a stepsister, Mary.

When Gregg was five, her family and she moved to Pasadena, California. She attended Jefferson High School, Pasadena Junior College, and Pacific Academy of Dramatic Art.

Career

Music
Before going into radio, Gregg played the double bass  with the Pasadena Symphony and Pops. She was a member of the Singing Strings group heard initially on KHJ in Los Angeles in 1937 and later on CBS and Mutual.

Radio

Gregg was a prolific radio actress, heard on such programs as The Adventures of Sam Spade, Dragnet, Dr. Kildare, Gunsmoke, The Jack Benny Program, Let George Do It, Lux Radio Theatre, One Man's Family, Yours Truly, Johnny Dollar, The Screen Guild Theater, CBS Radio Mystery Theatre, The Zero Hour, and Mutual Radio Theater.

On the radio series Have Gun–Will Travel (starring John Dehner as Paladin), Gregg portrayed Miss Wong (Hey Boy's girlfriend), and also appeared in very different roles in the concurrent television series with Richard Boone. She had the role of Betty Barbour on One Man's Family and played Richard Diamond's girlfriend, the wealthy Helen Asher, on the radio series Richard Diamond, Private Detective (starring Dick Powell as Diamond). She later guest-starred in an episode of the television version of Richard Diamond, starring David Janssen.

Feature films

Beginning with Body and Soul (1947), Gregg made more than 45 films, including I'll Cry Tomorrow (1955), Love Is a Many-Splendored Thing (1955), Portland Exposé (1957), The D.I. (1957), Operation Petticoat (1959), All the Fine Young Cannibals (1960), Man-Trap (1961), House of Women (1962), Spencer's Mountain (1963), Two on a Guillotine (1965), A Big Hand for the Little Lady (1966), The Bubble (1966), Madigan (1968), Heaven with a Gun (1969), Quarantined (1970), A Walk in the Spring Rain (1970), No Way Back (1976), and S.O.B. (1981)

Television
Gregg once said of her work as a character actress on television: "I work steadily, but I have no identity." She added, "When casting people have a call for a woman who looks like the wrath of God, I'm notified."
On television, Gregg appeared in nearly every narrative television series in the late 1950s through the early 1970s, including Bourbon Street Beat, Hawaiian Eye, 77 Sunset Strip, Gunsmoke (murderous and revenge-filled wife Mrs. Tillman in the episode “Joke’s On Us”), Bonanza, Lawman, Perry Mason, Maverick, Wanted Dead or Alive, The Virginian, Alfred Hitchcock Presents, Wagon Train, Mannix, Trackdown, Make Room for Daddy, Philip Marlowe, Mr. Adams and Eve, My Favorite Martian, The Twilight Zone, Hazel, Bewitched, Kung Fu, The Rockford Files, and My Three Sons.

Gregg played a judge in an episode of This Is the Life, in 1964.

In 1978, she played the role of herbal healer Ada Corley in a two-part episode of The Waltons titled "The Ordeal". Years earlier, she appeared as school teacher Miss Parker in the film Spencer's Mountain – an earlier adaptation of the Earl Hamner stories on which The Waltons was based.
  
Gregg may be best remembered for her many appearances in Dragnet. Jack Webb used her in dozens of roles on both the radio and TV versions of the show, as well as in the 1954 film version of Dragnet.  In later years, she appeared on other shows produced by Webb's production company, Mark VII Limited (e.g. Adam-12 and Emergency!).

Voice acting
Gregg was the voice for Riabouchinska, the ventriloquist doll, in the 1956 Alfred Hitchcock Presents TV episode "And So Died Riabouchinska". Gregg supplied the voice of Mrs. Bates in Psycho (1960), as did Jeanette Nolan and Paul Jasmin, all uncredited. Only Gregg did the voice in the sequels Psycho II and Psycho III. She voiced Tarra on the 1967 animated TV series The Herculoids. She reprised that role when the series was revived in 1981 as part of the Space Stars animated series.

Personal life
Gregg married producer Jaime del Valle in 1948 (another source says October 15, 1947, in Las Vegas, Nevada). They had three children, Gregg, Jaime, and Ricardo. They were divorced on December 22, 1959.

Gregg was active with Recording for the Blind, making recordings as a volunteer and serving on the group's board of directors.

Death
Gregg died from lung cancer in Encino, California, on September 15, 1986, aged 70.

Partial filmography

Notorious (1946) – File Clerk (uncredited)
Lost Honeymoon (1947) – Mrs. Osborne (uncredited)
Body and Soul (1947) – Irma (uncredited)
Gentleman's Agreement (1947) – Third Woman (uncredited)
Casbah (1948) – Madeline
The Amazing Mr. X (1948) – Emily
The Gay Intruders (1948) – Dr. Susan Nash
Flesh and Fury (1952) – Claire (uncredited)
Dragnet (1954) – Ethel Starkie
Love Is a Many-Splendored Thing (1955) – Anne Richards
I'll Cry Tomorrow (1955) – Ellen
Terror at Midnight (1956) – Helen Hill
Crime in the Streets (1956) – Mrs. Dane
The Fastest Gun Alive (1956) – Rose Tibbs
The D.I. (1957) – Mrs. Charles D. Owens
Portland Exposé (1957) – Clara Madison
Twilight for the Gods (1958) – Myra Pringle
Torpedo Run (1958) – Tokyo Rose (voice, uncredited)
The Hanging Tree (1959) – Edna Flaunce
Hound-Dog Man (1959) – Amy Waller
Operation Petticoat (1959) – Maj. Edna Heywood RN
Psycho (1960) – Norma Bates (voice, uncredited)
All the Fine Young Cannibals (1960) – Ada Davis
Maverick (1961 episode "The Ice Man") – Abbey
Man-Trap (1961) – Ruth
Mr. George (TV series Thriller) (9 May 1961) – Edna Leggett 
Gorath (1962) – (voice)
House of Women (1962) – Mrs. Edith Hunter
Shoot Out at Big Sag (1962) – SarahTreadway Hawker
Spencer's Mountain (1963) – Clayboy's teacher, Miss Parker
The Kiss of the Vampire (1963) – Rosa Stangher (US TV version)
The Virginian (1964 episode "The Secret of Brynmar Hall) – Mrs. Tyson
Two on a Guillotine (1965) – Dolly Bast
Joy in the Morning (1965) – Mrs. Lorgan
A Big Hand for the Little Lady (1966) – Mrs. Drummond
The Bubble (1966) – Ticket Cashier
"Dragnet" (1967-1970) - various roles
Madigan (1968) – Esther Newman
Heaven with a Gun (1969) – Mrs. Patterson
The Great Bank Robbery (1969) – Townswoman (voice, uncredited)
Quarantined (1970, TV Movie) – Nurse Nelson
A Walk in the Spring Rain (1970) – Ann Cade 
Adam-12 (1970–1975, several episodes) – various roles
Airport 1975 (1974) – Lily – Passenger (uncredited)
No Way Back (1976) – Mildred Pickens
Goodbye, Franklin High (1978) – Nurse
S.O.B. (1981) – Funeral Home Owner's Wife
Heidi's Song (1982) – Aunt Dete (voice)
Psycho II (1983) – Norma Bates (voice, uncredited)
Psycho III (1986) – Emma Spool (voice, uncredited) (final film role)

References

External links

 Official website
 

1916 births
1986 deaths
20th-century American actresses
Actresses from Illinois
American film actresses
American radio actresses
American television actresses
Deaths from lung cancer in California
People from Harrisburg, Illinois
Western (genre) film actresses
Western (genre) television actors